Niederschöneweide (literally Lower Schöneweide) is a German locality (Ortsteil) within the Berlin borough (Bezirk) of Treptow-Köpenick. It is, with Oberschöneweide (Upper Schöneweide), part of the geographic quarter of Schöneweide. Until 2001 it was part of the former borough of Treptow.

History
First mentioned in 1598 as Schöne Weyde, it became an autonomous municipality in 1850, growing as an industrial town at the end of 19th century. In 1920 it merged into Berlin with the "Greater Berlin Act". Between 1949 and 1990 it was part of East Berlin, and new residential complexes were established at Oberspree. All the industries on the territory were converted into Volkseigener Betrieb (VEB), the state-owned enterprises. In 1994, after German reunification, it started a plan for a redevelopment of many contaminated grounds on many areas, inheritance of the heavy industrial era. They must be cleared away and detoxified with high costs.

Geography

Overview
Located in the south-eastern side of the city and crossed by the river Spree, Niederschöneweide borders with the localities of Oberschöneweide, Plänterwald, Baumschulenweg, Johannisthal, Adlershof and Köpenick. A bit of the urban parks Köllnische Heide, situated in Adlershof, belongs to the quarter.

Subdivision
Niederschöneweide counts 1 zone (Ortslage):
Oberspree

Transport
As urban railways, Niederschöneweide is served both by S-Bahn and tramway lines. The railway stations serving the locality are Schöneweide (S45, S46, S47, S8, S85 and S9 lines+DB regional service), Johannisthal (S45, S46, S8, S85, S9) and Oberspree (S47). The tramway lines, crossing Brückenstraße and Michael-Brückner Straße, are the M17, 21, 27, 63 and 67.

Photos

Personalities
 Ernst Schneller (1890–1944)

References

External links

 Niederschöneweide official website
 Niederschöneweide page on www.berlin.de

Localities of Berlin